Zotalemimon vitalisi is a species of beetle in the family Cerambycidae. It was described by Pic in 1938.

References

vitalisi
Beetles described in 1938